East Ridge High School is a public high school in the Hamilton County Schools system located in the Chattanooga, Tennessee suburb of East Ridge.

It is a Title I school and the demographics (when?) are as follows: Caucasian students make up 43.3% of the school's population, African American students make up 32.8%, HIspanic or Latino students make up 21.3%, Asian and Pacific-Islander students make up 2.3%, and Native American students are represented in smaller numbers.

References

Public high schools in Tennessee
Schools in Hamilton County, Tennessee